St Swithin's Church, Kirklington, is a Grade II* listed parish church in the Church of England in Kirklington, Nottinghamshire, England.

History

The church dates from the 13th century. It was restored externally between 1873 and 1874 and internally in 1892.

It is in a joint parish with St Nicholas' Church, Hockerton.

Organ

The church contains a small 2 manual pipe organ dating from 1897. A specification of the organ can be found on the National Pipe Organ Register.

References

Church of England church buildings in Nottinghamshire
Grade II* listed churches in Nottinghamshire